Glenmacnass Waterfall is an 80-metre high waterfall situated at the head of the Glenmacnass Valley in the Wicklow Mountains in Ireland.  The Glenmacnass Waterfall is a popular tourist destination and scenic viewpoint area in the Wicklow Mountains.  The Waterfall is bounded to the west by Tonelagee, and to the east by Scarr mountain.  The entire Glenmacnass Valley can be accessed by the R115 road (also called the Military Road), which connects the Sally Gap in the north, to the village of Laragh in the south.

Geography

The river continues through the U-shaped valley until it joins the Avonmore River at the village of Laragh. It is later joined by the Avonbeg to become the Avoca and eventually flows into the Irish Sea at the coastal town called Arklow.

Geology
Geological Survey of Ireland (GSI) regard the valley as a "stunning example of a glaciated U-shaped valley, with oversteepened cliff sides and a flat floor". The valley dates from the last glacial period called the quaternary glaciation or Ice Age, and contains moraines marking the positions of the ice-front as it retreated back towards the source area higher up in the centre of the Wicklow mountains. The GSI highlight an impressive moraine about halfway between the waterfall and Laragh and can be seen as a boulder-strewn mound running right across the valley.

Glenmacnass Waterfall flows over grey-colored, smooth porphyritic granite bedrock (part of the Lugnaquilla pluton, which is itself from the late-Caledonian (405 Ma) Leinster Granite Batholith Formation). Further down the valley, on each side of the waterfall, dark grey-to-black, jagged schist rock (part of the Lower Palaeozoic Maulin Formation) can be seen jutting out; thus the waterfall has formed at the boundary between these two major rock types.

Access
The Glenmacnass Waterfall is a popular tourist destination and scenic viewpoint area in the Wicklow Mountains, and the entire Glenmacnass Valley can be accessed by the R115 road (also called the Military Road), which connects the Sally Gap to Laragh.  There are parking facilities at the top of the waterfall, and the waterfall and valley are in the Wicklow Mountains National Park.

Gallery

See also

 Powerscourt Waterfall
 Powerscourt Estate
 Torc Waterfall

References

External links
 Glenmacnass Waterfall Visit Wicklow (2018)

Tourist attractions in County Wicklow
Waterfalls of the Republic of Ireland
Valleys of County Wicklow